Ashkadar (Aşqaźar) is a rural locality (a village) in Otradovsky Selsoviet, Sterlitamaksky District, Bashkortostan, Russia. The population was 71 as of 2010. There are 4 streets.

Geography 
Ashkadar is located 13 km southwest of Sterlitamak (the district's administrative centre) by road. Vesyoly is the nearest rural locality.

References 

Rural localities in Sterlitamaksky District